Opus De Funk is an album by jazz organist Johnny "Hammond" Smith recorded for the Prestige label in 1961 but not released until 1966.

Reception

AllMusic awarded the album 4 stars stating "The really unusual element here is the presence of McCoy, because one doesn't usually associate vibes with jazz organ combos. The vibes work, however, and give the resonance of Smith's organ a lighter counterpoint that brightens up the overall sound".

Track listing
All compositions by Johnny "Hammond" Smith except where noted.
 "Opus de Funk" (Horace Silver) – 5:19
 "Almost Like Being in Love" (Alan Jay Lerner, Frederick Loewe) – 4:27
 "Autumn Leaves" (Joseph Kosma, Johnny Mercer) – 4:11
 "Sad Eyes" – 4:50
 "Gone With the Wind" (Herb Magidson, Allie Wrubel) – 5:45
 "If Someone Had Told Me" (Peter DeRose, Charles Tobias) – 4:31
 "Shirley's Theme" – 4:39
Recorded at Van Gelder Studio in Englewood Cliffs, New Jersey on February 14 (tracks 1-3) and May 12 (tracks 4-7), 1961.

Personnel
Johnny "Hammond" Smith – organ
Freddie McCoy – vibraphone
Eddie McFadden – guitar
Wendell Marshall – bass
Leo Stevens – drums
 Esmond Edwards – producer
 Rudy Van Gelder – engineer

References

Johnny "Hammond" Smith albums
1966 albums
Prestige Records albums
Albums produced by Esmond Edwards
Albums recorded at Van Gelder Studio